Samsonov and Samsonova (feminine) is a Russian surname derived from the name Samson. Currently, there are many variations in the name including Samsonov, Samsonenko, Samsonychev, Samsonyan, Samsikov, Samsonkin, and Samsononychev. In the United States, it is often spelled Samsonoff.

Notable people with the surname include:

 Alexander Samsonov (1859–1914), Russian military commander during World War I
 Aleksandr Samsonov (born 1953), Russian Olympic swimmer
 Artyom Samsonov (footballer, born 1994), Russian footballer
 Artyom Samsonov (footballer, born 1989), Russian footballer
 Daniil Samsonov (born 2005), Russian figure skater
 Ilya Samsonov (born 1997), professional ice hockey player
 Liudmila Samsonova (born 1998), Russian female tennis player
 Oleg Samsonov (born 1987), Russian soccer player
 Samson Samsonov (1921–2002), Soviet and Russian film director and screenwriter
 Sergei Samsonov (born 1978), professional ice hockey player
 Tamara Samsonova (born 1947), Russian murderer and suspected serial killer
 Viktor Samsonov (born 1941), acting Chief of the General Staff of the Armed Forces of the Russian Federation in 1996
 Vladimir Samsonov (born 1976), Belarusian professional table tennis player
 Yevgeny Samsonov (1926–2014), Soviet rower
 Zinaida Samsonova (1924–1944), medic and posthumous Hero of the Soviet Union

Russian-language surnames
Patronymic surnames
Surnames from given names